Paulo Manuel da Conceição Neves (born 24 March 1961) is a Portuguese executive, current CEO of Portugal Telecom. Paulo Neves holds a degree in electronic engineering from Instituto Superior Técnico of Lisbon (1984) and a graduate degree in telecommunications enterprise management by Instituto Superior de Transportes/ Instituto de Empresa of Madrid (1988).



Career 

Paulo Neves was appointed as CEO of Portugal Telecom in July 2015, by the Altice Group. Prior to joining PT, Paulo Neves held the position of President of the Directing Council of AMA (Agência para a Modernização Administrativa). Earlier, he was 13 years at Oni Group, where he worked in the areas of Regulation and Business Development, Operational Planning, Marketing and Business Internet.

Paulo Neves began his career at CTT from 1985 until 1989. Between 1989 and 1998 he held several management positions at Ericsson namely in Technical Support, Marketing and Sales, Transversal Management Enterprise Business Unit and Strategic Development, having also been a member of the Executive Management Team.

References 

1961 births
Living people
Portuguese chief executives
20th-century Portuguese businesspeople
21st-century Portuguese businesspeople